Najm al-Din Abu'l-Fath Salim/Sulayman ibn Muhammad al-Lukki al-Maghribi,  better known as Ibn Masal, was a military commander and official of the Fatimid Caliphate, who served briefly as the de facto vizier of the Caliphate from 1144/45 until he was overthrown and killed by al-Adil ibn al-Sallar and his supporters in the winter of 1149/50.

Life
His nisbah (al-Maghribī) and the name Maṣāl suggest a Berber origin. He was born in the town of Lukk in the Cyrenaica. From his father, he learned falconry and veterinary science, which enabled him to assume a military post in the Fatimid capital Cairo. Details of his military career are not known, but by 1144/45 he had risen to the point where he was entrusted with the leadership of the government by Caliph al-Hafiz. He was not given the title of vizier, however, which had been vacant since the ouster of Ridwan ibn Walakhshi in 1139, but instead was titled "supervisor of affairs" (nāẓir fi'l-umūr) and "supervisor of the public interests" (nāẓir fi'l-maṣāliḥ).

When al-Hafiz died in October 1149, his 16-year-old son al-Zafir succeeded him. Al-Zafir, who was more interested in the pleasures of the court than exercising governance, appointed Ibn Masal, despite the latter's advanced age, as his vizier. Ibn Masal received the customary titles of the Fatimid viziers, al-Sayyid al-ʿAjal ("most noble master"), Amīr al-Juyūsh ("commander of the armies"), and al-Mufaḍḍal ("the preferred one") or al-Afḍal ("most superior one"). He was quickly successful in calming the quarrels between the Turkish cavalry (Rayḥānī) and the black military slaves by distributing money and promising to take care of their future welfare.

He was soon after confronted with the rebellion of the governor of Alexandria, Ibn al-Sallar, who had entertained hopes of becoming vizier himself. Following the appointment of Ibn Masal, together with his stepson Abbas, Ibn al-Sallar marched on Cairo to seize the vizierate. When al-Zafir learned of Ibn Sallar's intentions, he called upon assistance from the grandees of the realm in support of Ibn Masal, but they proved unwilling to. In the end, the Caliph provided Ibn Masal with funds to raise an army for action against Ibn al-Sallar. Ibn Masal assembled a force of Lawata Berbers, of blacks, of Bedouin Arabs and of native Egyptians, but despite a first success in the field, he was soon forced to leave Cairo in December 1149 for Upper Egypt, to recruit more men, while Ibn al-Sallar took over the city. Ibn al-Sallar sent his stepson Abbas with an army against Ibn Masal and his ally, Badr ibn Rafi, who had tried unsuccessfully to rally resistance among the Arab tribes of the Nile Delta. The two armies met in battle at Dalas in the province of al-Bahnasa on 19 February 1150, in which Ibn Masal was defeated and killed. Abbas brought his severed head back to Cairo as a token of victory.

His vizierate had lasted only about 50 days. This was the last time a Fatimid caliph would exercise that right, as with Ibn al-Sallar's coup the vizierate became the object of fierce contest between rival strongmen, and the last Fatimid caliphs were reduced to mere figureheads.

References

Sources

 
 
 
 
 
 

1150 deaths
12th-century Berber people
12th-century people from the Fatimid Caliphate
Viziers of the Fatimid Caliphate
People from Cyrenaica
People killed in action